Mill Creek is a stream in central Ohio. It is a tributary of the Scioto River.

Early settlers built and operated many mills along Mill Creek, hence the name.

Marysville, Ohio, is the largest settlement on Mill Creek. 

A USGS gauge on the creek at Bellepoint recorded a mean annual discharge of  during water years 1944–2019.

See also
List of rivers of Ohio

References

Rivers of Delaware County, Ohio
Rivers of Logan County, Ohio
Rivers of Union County, Ohio
Rivers of Ohio